Oscar Osburn Winther (22 December 1903, Weeping Water, Nebraska – 22 May 1970, Bloomington, Indiana) was a history professor, specializing in the history of the western United States. He was the president of the Western History Association from 1963 to 1964 and the president of the Oral History Association from 1969 to 1970.

Biography
Winther was born into a Danish-American family as the youngest of six sons. The novelist Sophus Keith Winther was one of his five brothers. After secondary education at Eugene, Oregon's Eugene High School, Oscar Winther matriculated at the University of Oregon and graduated there in 1925 with a bachelor's degree in history. For several years he worked in canneries and taught high school to save money for graduate school. He became a graduate student in history and graduated in 1928 with an M.A. from Harvard University and in 1934 with a Ph.D. from Stanford University. His doctoral dissertation is titled The Express and Stagecoach Business in California, 1848–60.

After receiving his Ph.D., Winther held visiting positions at Stanford University and the San Jose Adult Education Center. From 1936 to 1937 he was an assistant curator of the Wells Fargo Bank and Union Trust Company Museum in San Francisco. In August 1937 he married Mary Merriam Galey (1910–1984). In the history department of Indiana University, he was an instructor from 1937 to 1943, an assistant professor from 1943 to 1947, an associate professor from 1947 to 1950, and a full professor from 1950 until his death in 1970. He was named a University Professor of History in 1965. He was a visiting professor at Johns Hopkins University, the University of Oregon, Brigham Young University, the University of Washington, the University of New Mexico, and Stanford University. He was the editor-in-chief of the Mississippi Valley Historical Review from 1963 to 1964 and oversaw the Review'''s transformation into the Journal of American History, of which he was the editor-in-chief from 1964 to 1966.

Winther was awarded Fulbright Fellowships in 1952 and 1965 and a Guggenheim fellowship in 1959. He was elected a Fellow of the UK's Royal Historical Society and a Fellow of the Society of American Historians.

Upon his death he was survived by his widow, a son, a daughter, and four brothers. In 1970 the Western History Association Council established the Oscar O. Winther award given each academic year in recognition of the peer-reviewed article judged to be the best published for that past year in the Western Historical Quarterly''.

Selected publications

Articles

Books

with William H. Cartwright:

as editor

as translator

References

1903 births
1970 deaths
20th-century American historians
20th-century American male writers
American male non-fiction writers
American people of Danish descent
South Eugene High School alumni
University of Oregon alumni
Harvard Graduate School of Arts and Sciences alumni
Stanford University alumni
Indiana University faculty